YNA may refer to:

Natashquan Airport, airport for Natashquan, Quebec, Canada.
Yeshivat Netiv Aryeh, a Religious Zionist Orthodox yeshiva in Jerusalem
The initials of the Yugoslav National Army which was in existence until 1992
Young Naturists America, a youth naturism organisation in the USA
Yonhap News Agency, a South Korean news agency